Bench or The Bench can refer to:

Furniture
Bench (furniture), a long seat
Memorial bench, a bench commemorating something that is deceased
Workbench, a table at which manual work is done
Countertop or benchtop

Arts
The Bench (2000 film), a Danish film
The Bench (TV series), a 2001 British series
The Bench (Hogarth), a painting by William Hogarth
The Bench (book), a 2021 children's book by Meghan, Duchess of Sussex

Business
Bench (British clothing brand)
Bench (Philippine clothing brand)
Bench Accounting, a company

Geology
Bench (geology),  a long, relatively narrow strip of relatively level or gently inclined land of differing origins that is bounded by distinctly steeper slopes above and below it
Benches, steps cut into the side of open-pit mines

Law and politics
Bench (law), the location where a judge sits while in court, often a raised desk in a courtroom; also refers to the judiciary as a whole, and to a group of judges hearing a case and judging on a case
Bench, the panel or body of justices of the peace in a specific county under the traditional English system of magistracy

People
Jo Bench, an English death metal bass player
Johnny Bench, a baseball player

Places
Bench, Idaho
Bench (woreda), a district in Ethiopia

Spoken
Bench language, spoken in the Bench Maji Zone of Ethiopia
Bench people, an ethnic group of Ethiopia, speakers of the Bench language 
Benching or bentching, an English-language term for reciting Birkat Hamazon

Sports
Bench, the place where players available for substitution wait (synonymously dugout); also referred to the players as such
In soccer, the technical area contains the bench
Bench (weight training), a piece of weight training equipment
Bench press, one of three power-lifting exercises
The Bench, the student rooting section for the University of California men's basketball team

See also
Benched (film), a 2018 sports drama
Benched (TV series), a 2014 sitcom
"Benched" (Modern Family), an episode of sitcom Modern Family
"Benched", an episode of drama series Hit the Floor
Benchmark (surveying)
Benchmarking (geolocating), a recreational activity in which participants search for benchmarks using a handheld Global Positioning System